Douglas is a Scottish masculine given name which originated from the surname Douglas. Although today the name is almost exclusively given to boys, it was used as a girl's name in the seventeenth and eighteenth centuries in the north of England. The Scottish surname Douglas was borne by one of the most powerful families of the Kingdom of Scotland (the Earls of Douglas, Angus, Morton, Dukes of Hamilton and others). It has sometimes been stated that the given name is connected with the given name Dougal, although it is more likely derived from the surname already mentioned.

Linguistically, Douglas is derived from the Gaelic elements: dubh, meaning "dark, black"; and glas, meaning "stream" (also a derivative of glas, meaning "green"). The surname Douglas is a habitational name, which could be derived from any of the many places so-named. While there are numerous places with this name in both Ireland and Scotland, it is thought, in most cases, to refer to Douglas, South Lanarkshire, which was once the stronghold of Clan Douglas.

The given name Doug is a common short form variant of Douglas. Pet forms of the given name include Dougie and Duggie. In Scotland, while spelled Dougie like the above, there is a distinct Scottish pronunciation of "Doogie".

Notable people named Douglas 
Douglas (footballer, born 1963) (William Douglas Humia Menezes), Brazilian footballer
Douglas (footballer, born 1982) (Douglas dos Santos), Brazilian footballer
Douglas (footballer, born March 1983) (Douglas Renato de Jesus), Brazilian footballer
Douglas (footballer, born December 1983) (Douglas David Fernandes), Brazilian footballer
Douglas (footballer, born 1985) (Douglas Marques dos Santos), Brazilian footballer
Douglas (footballer, born 1986) (Douglas de Oliveira), Brazilian footballer
Douglas (footballer, born 1987) (Dyanfres Douglas Chagas Matos), Brazilian footballer
Douglas (footballer, born 1988) (Douglas Franco Teixeira), Brazilian footballer
Douglas (footballer, born April 1990) (Douglas Silva Bacelar), Brazilian footballer
Douglas (footballer, born August 1990) (Douglas Pereira dos Santos), Brazilian footballer
Douglas (footballer, born 1995) (Douglas Matheus do Nascimento), Brazilian footballer
Douglas Abbott (1899–1987), Canadian politician
Douglas Adams (disambiguation), several people
Douglas Alexander (born 1967), Scottish politician
Doug Allen (disambiguation), several people
Douglas A. Anderson (born 1959), American author
Douglas Applegate (born 1928), American politician
Douglas Bader, British flying ace
Douglas Baker (disambiguation), several people
Douglas Barr, American actor
Doug Belden, American football player
Douglas Booth, British actor
Douglas Brinkley, American author
Douglas Bruce (disambiguation), several people
Douglas Burke (disambiguation), several people
Douglas Carswell, British politician, first elected MP for the UK Independence Party
Douglas Chandor (1897–1953), British-born portrait painter and garden designer
Douglas Costa, Brazilian footballer
Douglas Coupland, Canadian novelist
Douglas Cox (disambiguation), several people
Douglas DeMuro, American automotive journalist
Douglas Devananda (born 1957), Sri Lankan Tamil Cabinet minister, originally a militant of the separatist Eelam People's Revolutionary Liberation Front
Douglas Douglas-Hamilton, 8th Duke of Hamilton, 18th-century Scottish peer
Douglas Douglas-Hamilton, 14th Duke of Hamilton, pioneering aviator
Douglas Eggers, American football player
Doug Emhoff (born 1964), American lawyer and husband of U.S. Vice President Kamala Harris
Douglas Engelbart (1925–2013), American inventor and computer pioneer
Douglas Everett (disambiguation), several people
Douglas Fairbanks, American actor
Douglas Fairbanks Jr., American actor and son of Douglas Fairbanks and Mary Pickford
Douglas Ford (disambiguation), several people
Douglas Franco Teixeira (born 1988), Brazil-born Dutch footballer who plays as a centre-back, often known simply as "Douglas"
Douglas Frenkel, American professor at the University of Pennsylvania Law School
Douglas H. Ginsburg, American judge
Douglas Graham, several people
Douglas Gresham, American-British actor, biographer and producer
Doug Grimston, Canadian ice hockey administrator
Douglas Haig, 1st Earl Haig, British Field marshal
 Douglas Haig (actor) (1920–2011), American actor
Douglas Hamilton (disambiguation), several people
Douglas Hartree, English mathematician and physicist
Douglas A. Hicks, American author
Douglas Hodge (born 1960), English actor, director and musician
Douglas Hodge (businessman) (born 1957), American businessman
Douglas Hofstadter, American author and professor of cognitive science
Douglas Hyde, Irish academic and politician, first president of Ireland
Douglas Hyde (author), English political journalist and author
Douglas Johnson (disambiguation), several people
Doug Jones (disambiguation), several people
Douglas Harriman Kennedy (born 1967), American journalist
Douglas St. Clive Budd Jansze, Attorney General of Sri Lanka from 1957 to 1966
Douglas Júnior, Kazakhstani futsal player
 Douglas Forsythe Kelley (born 1928), American industrial designer
Douglas Lawrence, Australian organist
Doug Lawrence, American animator and voice actor
Douglas Liyanage, Sri Lankan Sinhala civil servant
Douglas Lowe (athlete), British athlete
Douglas Lowe (RAF officer) (1922–2018), British air chief marshal
Douglas Lubahn (1947–2019), American bassist
Douglas MacArthur, American general
 Douglas MacArthur II (1909–1997), American diplomat
 Douglas Hastings Macarthur (1839–1892), New Zealand politician
 Douglas Macgregor (disambiguation), several people
Doug Martsch, American guitarist and vocalist of indie rock band Built to Spill
 Douglas Francis McArthur (born 1943), Canadian politician and university professor
Doug McFarland, American politician
Douglas Mitchell (disambiguation), several people
Douglas Moore (disambiguation), several people
Douglas Albert Munro, American armed forces member
Doug Nordquist, American high jumper
Douglas Parker (born 1963), American dramatist and playwright
Douglas H. Parker (1926–2019), American law school professor
Douglas L. Parker, American attorney and government official
Douglas Parkhill, Canadian computer scientist and civil servant
Doug Pederson, American football coach
Douglas Peterson (disambiguation), several people
Douglas Polk, American professional poker player
Douglas Ranasinghe (born 1945), Sri Lankan Sinhala actor
Douglas Robb (disambiguation), several people
Douglas Roberts (disambiguation), several people
Dougal Robertson (1924–1991), Scottish author and sailor 
Douglas Rodrigues (disambiguation), several people
Douglas A. Ross, American political scientist
Douglas Santos (disambiguation), several people
 Douglas Saunders, Jamaican politician
Douglas Silva (disambiguation), several people
Douglas Simpson, Scottish field hockey forward
Doug Stanhope, American stand-up comedian and author
Douglas Trevor, American author and academic
Douglas Walatara (1920–2011), Sri Lankan educationist
Douglas H. Wheelock, American astronaut
 Douglas Wreden (born 1991), American YouTube personality who goes by the name DougDoug

References

See also
List of Irish-language given names
List of Scottish Gaelic given names

Anglicised Scottish Gaelic-language given names
English masculine given names
Given names originating from a surname
Scottish masculine given names